The 1953–54 NCAA men's basketball rankings was made up of two human polls, the AP Poll and the Coaches Poll.

Legend

AP Poll

UP Poll 
All UP polls for this season included 20 teams, with the exception of the final poll (released on March 9, 1954) which included only 10 teams.

References 

1953-54 NCAA Division I men's basketball rankings
College men's basketball rankings in the United States